Eduardo Muñoz Bachs (1937–2001) was a Cuban poster artist and comics artist. He was born on April 12, 1937, in Valencia, Spain, but moved to Cuba with his parents in 1941. In 1960, with no formal training in graphic design, he made the first poster for the Instituto Cubano de Arte e Industria Cinematograficos (ICAIC) that was founded shortly after the Cuban Revolution to produce and promote Cuban films.

The association with ICAIC lasted for a lifetime, and Bachs made over 2,000 movie posters for the institution. In his posters, the human figure, the face, or the entire body, are predominant and recurrent. Although colors are eye-catching and wide-ranging, they are never shocking. The drawing with childish and comic features and hand-made calligraphy define a large part of Muñoz Bach's poster for the ICAIC, creating a unique style within the Cuban poster design of the half of the 20th century and serving as inspiration to notable contemporary Cuban poster artists such as Fabián Muñoz, Nelson Ponce and Erick Ginard.

He is counted among the greatest Cuban poster designers - many times nicknamed The Cuban Poster Master of All Time -. His work contributed like no other to the international admiration that colorful Cuban posters enjoyed in the 1970s.

Muñoz Bach's work also included animation and children's books illustration, illustrating more than fifty texts throughout his life for renowned Cuban authors such as Dora Alonso. In his role as an illustrator of children's books, he breathes a dose of naivety, fused with light-hearted humor and intelligent satire. Muñoz Bach himself expressed: "Illustrating a children's notebook represents an artistic liberation that demands an overflow of ideas from me; He invites me to equate myself with the boy's fantasy".

He also ventured into the world of comic strips. With scripts by Félix Guerra, Bachs made several comic series for Editorial Pablo de la Torriente in the 1980s, most notably El Cuento, a collection of ironic fables.

His foundational and majestic work was recorded in the documentary memory of the film El cine y yo, by Cuban director Mayra Vilasís.

See also
 Cuban art
 List of Cuban artists
 List of Cuban films

Sources

1937 births
2001 deaths
Cuban artists
Cuban comics artists
Cuban poster artists
Spanish emigrants to Cuba